Enoch of Ascoli ( 1400 – c. 1457) was a humanist and agent of Nicholas V in charge of collecting manuscripts around Europe for the newly founded library of the pope.

He is notably responsible for the finding and retrieval, from a German monastery, of the only existing manuscript of Tacitus's minor books.

References

External links 
 The free dictionary 
 Where the manuscript is currently held 

Italian Renaissance humanists
1400s births
1450s deaths